This list shows all deputies to the National Assembly of France from the Hautes-Alpes department.  The current deputies are Pascale Boyer and Joël Giraud.

Estates General
 Jacques-Bernardin Colaud de La Salcette from the province of Dauphiné

National Constituent Assembly 17 June 1789 - 30 September 1791

National Legislative Assembly 1 October 1791 - 20 September 1792
 Claude-Simon Amat
 Joseph Dongois
 Pierre Faure-Lacombe
 Guillaume Ferrus
 Jean Labastie

Convention nationale 21 September 1792 - 26 October 1795
 Ignace de Cazeneuve
 Pierre Barrety
 Hyacinthe Borel
 Jean Serres
 Jean-François Izoard

Conseil des Cinq-Cents 27 October 1795 - 26 December 1799
 Jean-Louis Blanc
 Jacques-Bernardin Colaud de La Salcette
 Pierre Lachau
 Ignace de Cazeneuve
 Hyacinthe Borel
 Jean Serres
 Paul Bontoux
 Jean-François Izoard
 Pierre Nicolas de Meissas

First Empire

Corps législatif 1 January 1800 - 4 June 1814
 Jean-Louis Blanc
 Louis Agnel
 Jean-François Bonnot
 Charles Anglès

Chambre des députés 4 June 1814 - 20 March 1815

Chambre des représentants 3 June 1815 - 13 July 1815

 Louis Faure
 Joseph Provensal de Lompré
 Jean Barrilon
 Jacques Ardoin

Chamber of Deputies (2nd restoration)

1st legislature 

 Jules Anglès
 Jean Paul Cyrus Colomb

2nd legislature 

 Jean-François Anglès
 Honoré Bucelle
 Jean Paul Cyrus Colomb

3rd legislature 

 Honoré Bucelle
 Jean Paul Cyrus Colomb

4th legislature 

 Jean Paul Cyrus Colomb
 Jean Joseph Amat

5th legislature 
 Jean Paul Cyrus Colomb
 Jean Joseph Amat

Chamber of Deputies (France) (July Monarchy)

1st Legislature (1830-1831)

 Jean Paul Cyrus Colomb
 Jean Joseph Amat

2nd Legislature (1831-1834)

 Pascal Joseph Faure
 Jean-Antoine Allier

3rd Legislature (1834-1837)

 Pascal Joseph Faure
 Jean-Antoine Allier

4th Legislature (1837-1839)

 Pierre-Louis-Auguste-Bruno Blanc de La Nautte d'Hauterive
 Jacques Ardoin

5th Legislature (1839-1842)

 Pierre-Louis-Auguste-Bruno Blanc de La Nautte d'Hauterive
 Antoine Allier

5th Legislature (1842-1846)

 Pierre-Louis-Auguste-Bruno Blanc de La Nautte d'Hauterive
 Antoine Allier

5th Legislature (1846-1848)

 Ernest Desclozeaux
 Pierre-Louis-Auguste-Bruno Blanc de La Nautte d'Hauterive

Second Republic 
Elections by universal male suffrage from 1848

National Constituent Assembly (1848-1849) 

 Calixte Laforgue-Bellegarde
 Pascal Joseph Faure
 Antoine Allier

National Legislative Assembly (1849-1851) 

 Cyprien Chaix
 Pascal Joseph Faure
 Antoine Allier

Second Empire

1st Legislature (1852-1857) 

 Pascal Joseph Faure

2nd Legislature (1857-1863) 

 Pascal Joseph Faure

3rd Legislature (1863-1869) 

 Maurice Désiré Garnier

4th Legislature (1869-1870) 

 Clément Duvernois

Third Republic

National Assembly (1871 - 1876) 
 Ernest Cézanne
 Louis de Ventavon

1st Legislature (1876 - 1877) 
 Ernest Cézanne died 1876, replaced by Barthélémy Ferrary
 Cyprien Chaix
 Honoré Chancel

2nd Legislature (1877 - 1881) 
 Léon Laurençon
 Antoine d'Estienne de Prunières invalid in 1878, replaced by Barthélémy Ferrary
 Paul Eugène Bontoux invalid in 1877, replaced by Cyprien Chaix

3rd Legislature (1881 - 1885) 
 Léon Laurençon
 Barthélémy Ferrary
 Cyprien Chaix

4th Legislature (1885 - 1889) 
 Léon Laurençon
 Cyprien Chaix elected Senator in 1888, replaced by Émile Flourens
 Barthélémy Ferrary died in 1886, replaced by  Joseph Grimaud

5th Legislature (1889 - 1893) 
 Léon Laurençon
 Frédéric Euzière
 Émile Flourens

6th Legislature (1893 - 1898) 
 Léon Laurençon
 Frédéric Euzière
 Émile Flourens

VIIth Legislature (1898 - 1902) 
 Léon Laurençon
 François Pavie
 Frédéric Euzière

VIIIth Legislature (1902 - 1906) 
 Léon Laurençon
 François Pavie
 Frédéric Euzière

IXth Legislature (1906 - 1910) 
 Émile Merle
 Victor Bonniard
 Frédéric Euzière

Xth Legislature (1910 - 1914) 
 Maurice Toy-Riont
 Antoine Blanc elected Senator in 1912, replaced by Victor Peytral
 Victor Bonniard

XIth Legislature (1914 - 1919) 
 Victor Peytral
 François Gilbert Planche
 Victor Bonniard

XIIth Legislature (1919 - 1924) 
The legislative elections of 1919 were organised by proportional list voting. They marked the national victory of the centre-right National Bloc.

 Maurice de Rothschild
 Paul Caillat
 Georges Noblemaire died in 1923
 Victor Bonniard elected Senator in 1921, replaced by François Gilbert Planche

XIIIth Legislature (1924 - 1928) 
The legislative elections of 1919 were organised by proportional list voting. They marked the national victory of the Cartel of the Left

 Léon Cornand replaced by Maurice Petsche
 Maurice de Rothschild
 Louis Cluzel

XIVth Legislature (1928 - 1932) 
Legislative elections were by majority rounding ballot in two rounds from 1928 to 1936.

 Maurice Petsche
 Maurice de Rothschild elected Senator of 1930, replaced by Ernest Grimaud
 Ernest Lafont

XVth Legislature (1932 - 1936) 
 Maurice Petsche
 Ernest Grimaud
 Ernest Lafont

XVIth Legislature (1936 - 1940) 
 Jean Michard-Pellissier
 Maurice Petsche
 Auguste Muret

Fourth Republic

1st constituent assembly 
 Louis Richier
 Gaston Julian

2nd constituent assembly 
 Gaston Julian 
 Maurice Petsche

1st legislature (1946-51) 
 Gaston Julian 
 Maurice Petsche

2nd legislature (1951-1956) 
 Maurice Petsche (died in 1951)
 Marie François-Bénard
 Jean Aubin

3rd legislature (1956-1958) 
 Marie François-Bénard
 Gaston Julian

Fifth Republic

1st legislature (1958-1962)

2nd legislature (1962-1967)

3rd legislature (1967-1968)

4th legislature (1968-1973)

5th legislature (1973-1978)

6th legislature (1978-1981)

7th legislature (1981-1986)

8th legislature (1986-1988) 
2 deputies, elected via proportional representation.

 Pierre Bernard-Reymond (UDF)
 Daniel Chevallier (PS)

9th legislature (1988-1993)

10th legislature (1993-1997)

11th legislature (1997-2002)

12th legislature (2002-2007)

13th legislature (2007-2012)

14th legislature (2012-2017)

15th legislature (2017-2022)

16th legislature (2022-2027)

References 

Legislatures of the National Assembly (France)
Lists of members of the National Assembly (France)
Hautes-Alpes